Marine Aviation Training Support Group 53 (MATSG-53) was a United States Marine Corps aviation training group located at Naval Air Station Whidbey Island, Washington.

Mission
Furnish highly qualified Fleet Replacement EA-6B Prowler personnel to the Fleet Marine Force and also provide the Commandant of the Marine Corps administrative and logistical support for assigned Marine Corps Personnel and to perform other tasks directed by the Commandant.

History

See also
 United States Marine Corps Aviation
 List of United States Marine Corps aircraft groups

Notes
This article incorporates text in the public domain from the United States Marine Corps.

References

External links
 MATSG-53 official website

Tr
Military units and formations in Washington (state)